Alina Oleksandrivna Maksymenko (born 10 July 1991) is a retired individual rhythmic gymnast.

Career 
In 2008, Maksymenko participated as a member of the Ukrainian Group at the 2008 Summer Olympics in Beijing, China. They finished eighth in the group all-around finals.

At the 2009 World Championships in Ise, Mie, Japan, Maksymenko began competing as an individual gymnast and placed 16th in the all-around final. At the 2010 World Championships in Moscow, Russia, she placed 5th in the all-around final. She was also one of the only two gymnasts to qualify for all of the event finals (the other being Aliya Garayeva).

Maksymenko won three golds and one silver medal at the Deriugina World Cup 2011. At the 2011 Universiade held in Shenzhen, she won the silver medal in the hoop final (28.100) and the bronze medal in the clubs final. Maksymenko also helped Ukraine win the team bronze medal at the 2011 World Championships. Maksymenko qualified for the London 2012 Olympics.

She started her 2012 season competing at the LA Lights in Los Angeles but struggled with her new routines and finished behind fellow Ukrainian Ganna Rizatdinova in all-around. She then competed at the 2012 Deriugina Cup and took silver in all-around behind Russian gymnast Daria Dmitrieva. Maksymenko competed at the 2012 Summer Olympics in London. She qualified for the finals and finished 6th overall.

At the 2013 LA Lights, she won the silver medal in the all-around behind teammate Ganna Rizatdinova. She then competed at the 2013 Holon Grand Prix where she finished 12th in all-around and won gold in clubs final. She finished 5th in all-around in her first World Cup competition of the season in Lisbon, Portugal. At the 2013 Irina Deleanu Cup, she won the silver in all-around and bronze in clubs. She won another bronze medal in hoop final at the Pesaro World Cup. She withdrew from the Sofia World Cup due to an aggravated injury. Maksymenko then competed at the 2013 European Championships in Vienna, Austria and together with her teammates ( Ganna Rizatdinova and Viktoria Mazur ) won the Team silver medal. Maksymenko competed at the International Trophy "Ciutat de Barcelona" where she won silver in All-around behind Russian gymnast Alexandra Merkulova. At the 2013 Summer Universiade in Kazan, she finished 4th in all-around behind teammate Ganna Rizatdinova. She won silver in hoop (tied with teammate Rizatdinova) and bronze in clubs (also tied with Rizatdinova). Maksymenko together with Rizatdinova and Mazur appeared in an editorial on the 2013 August edition of Ukraine Vogue. Maksymenko competed at the 2013 World Games in Cali where she won bronze medal in ball and clubs. Maksymenko won a bronze in Clubs at the 2013 World Championships in Kyiv, Ukraine. Maksymenko finished 7th in the All-around at the 2013 World Championships. Maksymenko completed her career at the end of the 2013 season and accepted the invitation of her coaches in the Deriugins School to work as a coach.
Maksymenko can speak Ukrainian, English and Russian.

Routine Music Information

Detailed Olympic results

References

External links
 
 
 
 
 

1991 births
Living people
Ukrainian rhythmic gymnasts
Deriugins Gymnasts
Gymnasts from Kyiv
Sportspeople from Zaporizhzhia
Gymnasts at the 2008 Summer Olympics
Gymnasts at the 2012 Summer Olympics
Olympic gymnasts of Ukraine
Medalists at the Rhythmic Gymnastics European Championships
Medalists at the Rhythmic Gymnastics World Championships
World Games bronze medalists
Competitors at the 2013 World Games
Universiade medalists in gymnastics
Universiade silver medalists for Ukraine
Universiade bronze medalists for Ukraine
Medalists at the 2011 Summer Universiade
Medalists at the 2013 Summer Universiade